Samuel William Henry (December 28, 1956 – February 20, 2022) was an American drummer, best known for his work with the punk rock group The Wipers. He was inducted into the Oregon Music Hall of Fame in 2011.

Musical career

The Wipers
Henry played with multiple bands growing up but it was not until 1975/76 when he met Greg Sage and Dave Koupal that he formed his first serious band. The trio played for a year or so together before moving to Cape Coral, Florida, and forming what then became the band The Wipers in 1977, with the original lineup of Sam Henry on drums, Dave Koupal on bass, and Greg Sage on guitar and vocals. According to Henry they had to move out of Portland because the insurgence of the 70's disco left them with no place to play. After moving out of Florida and back to Portland The band recorded and released their first two singles ("Better Off Dead" and "Alien Boy"), as well as their first full length "Is This Real". The band continued to move around the country including making a move to New York, but in 1979 Henry left the band and joined Fred Cole and his wife Toody Cole to play in the pre-Dead Moon band called The Rats.

Napalm Beach
Henry was the drummer in The Rats until 1981 when he left the band and joined Chris Newman to play in Napalm Beach. Napalm Beach was Henry's longest running band, playing their final show on Sam's 60th birthday.

Jenny Don't and the Spurs
In 2009 Henry formed the Portland band "Don't" with Jenny Connors, Dan Lowinger, and David Minick. The group released a full-length LP titled "Away, Away" and two 45's on Kelly Halliburton's label "Doomtown Sounds" and one single on the Long Island label "Dead Broke Rekerds". Don't went on tour with Pierced Arrows as direct support for two U.S. tours in 2011 and 2012 and toured Europe in 2013.

Henry and Jenny also joined with Kelly Halliburton to form the roots/alt-country band Jenny Don't and The Spurs.  The trio released their first single on Fred Cole's label Tombstone Records.

Personal life and death
Henry died from complications of stomach cancer on February 20, 2022, at the age of 65.

References

External links
 SamHenryDrums.com (official website) (DEAD LINK)
 2011 Inductees Oregon Music Hall of Fame 
 The Rats (DEAD LINK) 
 Meyer, Erika Introducing Napalm Beach skullmanrecords.com. (2013)
 DON'T from Portland
 

1956 births
2022 deaths
20th-century American drummers
20th-century American male musicians
American male drummers
Musicians from Portland, Oregon
People from Oregon City, Oregon